The Matara Municipal Council is the local council for Matara, the second largest city in the Southern Province of Sri Lanka, the third level administrative division of the country. The council was established under the Municipalities Ordinance of 1865 as the 13th municipal council of Sri Lanka.

Geography

Administrative units
Matara Municipal Council is divided into 36 Grama Niladhari Divisions (GN Divisions), with seven villages.

Population
The current population of Matara Four Gravets area, according to 2011 Census, is 114,970, a decline from the population of 103,246 in 2001.

Mayor
The Mayor of Matara is the head of Matara Municipal Council and his office is located at the Matara Town Hall. Mayor Sosindra Handunge resigned on 20 September 2015 from his position and the current acting mayor is Ranjith Yasaratna.

Representation
The Matara Municipal Council is divided into 30 wards and is represented by 30 councillors, elected using an open list proportional representation system.

2018 local government election
Results of the local government election held on 8 February 2018:

2011 local government election
Results of the local government election held on 8 October 2011:

Preference votes (2011) results as below:

Sosindra Handunge UPFA: topping the list with – 8,389 votes followed by UPFA candidates K.D.G Yasarathna – 7,206 and Chathura Galappaththi with 6,356 and UNP list :  Upul Nishantha – 7,486 votes followed by Nandasena Sellaheva – 3,035 preference votes respectively.

The Matara Municipal Council has five standing committees each headed by committee chairman. The standing committees are Finance and Tender, Works and Solid Waste, Health and Sanitisation, Electricity and Water, and Environment.

References

Matara, Sri Lanka
Local authorities in Southern Province, Sri Lanka
Municipal councils of Sri Lanka